The Monument to Michael the Brave is a monument to the victory of Michael the Brave in the Battle of Guruslău (Goroszló). It is located in Guruslău, Sălaj, Romania.

Footnotes

External links 
  Guruslau, Monument Mihai Viteazul

Historic monuments in Sălaj County
Monuments and memorials in Romania
Michael the Brave